Finders Keepers is a 1952 American comedy film directed by Fred de Cordova and written by Richard Morris. The film stars Tom Ewell, Julie Adams, Evelyn Varden, Dusty Henley, Harold Vermilyea and Douglas Fowley. The film was released in January 1952, by Universal-International Pictures.

Plot

Cast         
Tom Ewell as Tiger Kipps
Julie Adams as Sue Kipps 
Evelyn Varden as Ma Kipps
Dusty Henley as Tiger Kipps Jr.
Harold Vermilyea as Mr. Fizpatrick
Douglas Fowley as Frankie Simmons
Richard Reeves as Joey
Jack Elam as Eddie
Herbert Anderson as Hotel Clerk

References

External links
 

1952 films
American comedy films
1952 comedy films
Universal Pictures films
Films directed by Frederick de Cordova
Films scored by Hans J. Salter
American black-and-white films
1950s English-language films
1950s American films